Catholic involvement in the temperance movement has been very strong since at least the nineteenth century, with a number of specifically Catholic societies formed to encourage moderation or total abstinence from alcohol.

In Ireland, the priest Theobald Mathew persuaded thousands of people to sign the temperance pledge, therefore, establishing the Teetotal Abstinence Society in 1838, which would later be renamed the Knights of Father Mathew. The League of the Cross was a Catholic total abstinence confraternity founded in 1873 by Cardinal Henry Edward Manning.

The Plenary Councils of Baltimore declared:

Pope Leo XIII, on 27 March 1887, commended the work of the temperance movement, especially the Catholic Total Abstinence Union, "esteem[ing] worthy of all commendation the noble resolve of your pious associations, by which they pledge themselves to abstain totally from every kind of intoxicating drinks." James Joseph McGovern wrote that Leo XIII supported total abstinence during his long Pontificate", giving "unqualified encouragement to Cardinal Manning who labored most zealously for the suppreession of the liquor traffic that was so demoralizing to the working classes in England."

In 1898, James Cullen founded the Pioneer Total Abstinence Association in response to the fading influence of the original temperance pledge and this organisation remains active to this day.

In 1911, The Michigan Catholic implored the faithful: “Vote for the saloon if you want future generations to be shriveled, bloodless, prematurely decayed creatures. … Vote against the saloon if you wish to build up a race of giant, healthy manhood and glorious womanhood.”

See also

 Temperance movement

References

Footnotes

Bibliography

 
 

19th-century Catholicism
Catholic